Azerbaijani rugs are traditional rugs made in Azerbaijan. The Azerbaijani rug is a handmade textile of various sizes, with a dense texture and a pile or pile-less surface, whose patterns are characteristic of Azerbaijan's many carpet-making regions. Traditionally, the carpets were used in Azerbaijan to cover floors, decorate interior walls, sofas, chairs, beds and tables.

Carpet making is a family tradition transferred orally and through practice, with carpet making and rug making being solely a women's occupation. In the past, every young girl had to learn the art of weaving carpets, and the carpets she wove became a part of her dowry. In the case of a newly married son, it was his mother who wove a large rug for his new household. Traditionally, men sheared the sheep in the spring and autumn, while women collected dyestuffs and spun and dyed the yarn in the spring, summer and autumn.

Peer-reviewed International Journal of Heritage Studies explains: "While it is difficult to find Azerbaijani carpet as a category on its own before the 1930s, Baku was known as a convenient place ‘for obtaining a constant and abundant supply of genuine article [Oriental carpets]’ (Coxon 1884, 2)."

In November 2010 the Azerbaijani carpet was proclaimed a Masterpiece of Intangible Heritage by UNESCO.

Gallery

Carpets in social and economic life 

In Azerbaijan, carpets are used to decorate the home, carry a cultural significance as a family tradition transferred verbally and with practicing, and are associated with the daily lives and customs of Azerbaijani people. Azerbaijani folk art, particularly carpet weaving, has been the subject of attention from the government to preserve, study, promote and develop carpet weaving traditions of Azerbaijani people. A law called “On the Protection and Development of Carpet Art of Azerbaijan" was adopted in December 2004, "Azerkhalcha" was established in May 2016, Carpet Weaver Day started to be celebrated on May 5th according to a presidential decree. A new building for Azerbaijan Carpet Museum, which was designed by Austrian architect Franz Janz in the shape of a rolled carpet, was constructed between 2007 and 2014. In addition, a state program on the “Protection and development of carpet art in the Republic of Azerbaijan 2018–2022” was approved in February 2018 by President Ilham Aliyev with the aim of creating raw material supply for this industry, improving the infrastructure for carpet-weaving, support the establishment of new workplaces, carry out qualified personnel training in the field of carpet-weaving, wool processing, wool and silk yarns manufacturing, and processing plants used for dyeing and production of dyes.

See also
 Azerbaijani Carpet Weaving
Azerbaijan Carpet Museum
Latif Karimov

References

External links
 
 National Carpet Museum during the Soviet Era
 History of Azerbaijani Carpets/Rugs 

Azerbaijani culture
 
Masterpieces of the Oral and Intangible Heritage of Humanity
Turkic rugs and carpets
National symbols of Azerbaijan
Oriental rugs and carpets